After the October Revolution of November 7, 1917 (October 25 Old Calendar) there was a movement within the Soviet Union to unite all of the people of the world under Communist rule (see Communist International). This included the Eastern bloc countries as well as the Balkan States. Communism as interpreted by Vladimir Lenin and his successors in the Soviet government required the abolition of religion and to this effect the Soviet government launched a long-running campaign to eliminate religion from society. Since some of these Slavic states tied their ethnic heritage to their ethnic churches, both the peoples and their churches were targeted by the Soviets.

Across Eastern Europe following World War II, parts of the former Nazi Germany liberated by the Soviet Red Army and Yugoslav Partisans became one-party communist states and the project of coercive conversion to atheism continued. The Soviet Union ended its war time truce against the Russian Orthodox Church, and extended its persecutions to the newly Communist Eastern bloc: "In Poland, Hungary, Lithuania and other Eastern European countries, Catholic leaders who were unwilling to be silent were denounced, publicly humiliated or imprisoned by the Communists. Leaders of the national Orthodox Churches in Romania and Bulgaria had to be cautious and submissive", wrote Geoffrey Blainey. While the churches were generally not as severely treated as they had been in the Soviet Union, nearly all their schools and many of their churches were closed, and they lost their formally prominent roles in public life. Children were taught atheism, and clergy were imprisoned by the thousands.  In the Eastern Bloc, Christian churches, along with Jewish synagogues and Islamic mosques were forcibly "converted into museums of atheism." According to some sources, the total number of Christian victims under the Soviet regime has been estimated to range around 12 to 20 million.

Treatment of Christians

Soviet Union

Very soon after the October Revolution, the campaign to end religion – and more specifically, Christianity, Judaism and Islam – began. In 1920, the White Sea camp was opened on the grounds of a once Russian Orthodox Monastery. At this camp, which took mainly Orthodox and Catholic priests, the prototype for other Soviet camps was revealed. The camp began to exterminate those who would not bend to state.

Under the doctrine of state atheism in the Soviet Union, there was a "government-sponsored program of forced conversion to atheism" conducted by Communists. The Communist Party destroyed churches, mosques and temples, ridiculed, harassed, incarcerated and executed religious leaders, flooded the schools and media with anti-religious teachings, and introduced a belief system called "scientific atheism", with its own rituals, promises and proselytizers. Many priests were killed and imprisoned, and thousands of churches were closed. In 1925, the government founded the League of Militant Atheists to intensify the persecution. The League of Militant Atheists was a "nominally independent organization established by the Communist Party to promote atheism".

The state established atheism as the only scientific truth. Soviet authorities forbade the criticism of atheism and agnosticism or of the state's anti-religious policies, until 1936; such criticism could lead to forced retirement. Militant atheism became central to the ideology of the Communist Party of the Soviet Union and a high priority policy of all Soviet leaders. Christopher Marsh, a professor at Baylor University, writes that "Tracing the social nature of religion from Schleiermacher and Feuerbach to Marx, Engels, and Lenin...the idea of religion as a social product evolved to the point of policies aimed at the forced conversion of believers to atheism."

A few years later, in 1929, priests were not considered workers; thus, they were given higher taxes. Priests also could not serve in the military because they were ineligible. The priests, because of their ineligibility, were given non-service taxes, which was calculated to be more than 100% of their income. Priests also were ineligible to join collective farms. Because of this, they were given no health care, pensions, or social security. By 1939, only 500 out of 50,000 churches remained open.

Christian churches, Jewish synagogues and Islamic mosques were forcibly "converted into museums of atheism". Historical essayist Andrei Brezianu expounds upon this situation, writing that scientific atheism was "aggressively applied to Moldova, immediately after the 1940 annexation, when churches were profaned, clergy assaulted, and signs and public symbols of religion were prohibited"; he provides an example of this phenomenon, further writing that "St. Theodora Church in downtown Chişinău was converted into the city's Museum of Scientific Atheism". Marxist-Leninist regimes treated religious believers as subversives or abnormal, sometimes relegating them to psychiatric hospitals and reeducation. Nevertheless, historian Emily Baran writes that "some accounts suggest the conversion to militant atheism did not always end individuals' existential questions".

After the German invasion of the USSR in 1941, Stalin revived the Russian Orthodox Church to raise morale for the war effort. Consequently, by 1957, there were almost 22,000 Orthodox churches in the USSR. However, in 1959, Nikita Khrushchev initiated a new anti-religious campaign, which led to the closure of almost 12,000 churches. By 1985, only 7,000 churches remained active.

By the end of the Khrushchev era, 50,000 clergy were executed, and many of the church hierarchy were replaced by individuals who had connections with the KGB. With the drafting of the new Constitution in 1977, however, "freedom of conscience, that is, the right to profess or not to profess any religion, and to conduct religious worship or atheistic propaganda" was guaranteed.

In 1995, the Russian state commissioner confirmed that 200,000 Russian Orthodox priests, monks, and nuns were killed. According to one estimate made in Russian schoolbooks in the 1990s, 20 million Soviet and East European citizens died in Communist labor camps, while 15 million more were killed in mass executions. This number included Christians, Jews, and various other denominations, as well as nonbelievers.

People's Republic of Bulgaria
The Orthodox church received some favour against other religions in Bulgaria, in exchange for total submission to the state and a limitation of activities. Roman Catholics and Protestants were treated with constant harassment and had few legal rights.

Czechoslovakia

The Communist government in Prague tried to destroy all organized religion in Czechoslovakia, especially the Roman and Greek churches. It emulated many practices of the anti-religious campaign in the Soviet Union, such as creating bodies to control religious activities and punishing priests who failed to comply with the many laws on religion; the punishments meted out for such violations were not as great as occurred in the USSR, however.

The historical alliance between the Catholic Church and the Dual monarchy, as well as feudal rule, led to the state labelling the Catholic clergy as enemies of the people.

Slovak emigres abroad contributed resources to the church under communist rule in Slovakia and smuggled religious literature into Slovakia through Poland. Pope Paul VI created an independent archbishopric for Slovakia in 1977; however, the government blocked an appointment of a new archbishop until 1988.

German Democratic Republic

Religion became contested ground in the German Democratic Republic, with the governing Communists promoting state atheism, although some people remained loyal to Christian communities. At first, the promotion of atheism received little official attention. In the mid-1950s, as the Cold War heated up, atheism became a topic of major interest for the state, in both domestic and foreign contexts.

The Protestant regional churches in Germany, Lutheran, Reformed or united by confession, had a long history of submission to the temporal authorities. This submission under Nazi rule led to many of its members being compromised or silent on various moral issues. Once the Communists took power in the East, the Protestants broke with historical precedent and became opponents of the government. In 1945, they formed part of a common umbrella with Protestants in West Germany, the Evangelical Church in Germany (EKD), and rejected silence on moral issues. The East German government was reluctant to eliminate organized religion, and the 1949 constitution gave the churches many rights and provisions, including a capacity to take a position on public issues. The East German Protestant churches were the largest organizations in the country that were independent of the communist party or the state.

The regime forced the churches in East Germany to break outside ties with the West.

The East German government had to take measures to avoid having their negative actions against the churches broadcast to Christians in West Germany, and the hard currency that West Germans gave to East German churches was seen by the government as something that should not be jeopardized because of its help to the economy.

In 1969, under the pressure of the East German government, the regional Protestant churches in East Germany had to secede from the Evangelical Church in Germany (EKD), until then comprising regional Protestant churches in both Germanies. The regional Protestant churches in East Germany then formed a new organization called the Bund der Evangelischen Kirchen in der DDR (Confederation of Protestant Churches in the GDR). The churches were called to be promoters of socialism; however, the churches themselves, while accepting this role, also considered themselves to be the determiners of what this meant (rather than the government), and they criticized the state when its policies were immoral, while they applauded the state when its policies were positive. They provided such a strong force that the regime sometimes had to change its policies as a result of church pressure.

The government put significant pressure on the churches to submit to its authority, nonetheless. It did not, however, attempt to implement the same level of state control over churches as occurred in other Warsaw pact countries. The regime had difficulties in attempting to control the Protestant churches in Germany as a result of their fragmented nature, even down to the local level and the regionalism present in Germany.

Like in neighboring Poland, the churches in East Germany championed the mass political dissent against the regime in the 1980s. Most of the mass protests began with church prayer meetings that provided a focus for the opposition. It fostered the youth counter culture and emphasized the church's positive role in society. The churches fostered discussion on issues such as rock music, sexuality, life in the third world, alcoholism, life in the GDR, and the militarization of society, etc. This drew large crowds.

The churches promoted change in the GDR, not by overthrowing the authorities, but through peaceful change.

People's Republic of Poland

The Catholic Church in Poland provided strong resistance to the Communist regime and Poland itself had a long history of dissent to foreign rule. The Polish nation rallied to the church, just as occurred in neighbouring Lithuania, which made it more difficult for the regime to impose its antireligious policies in the same fashion as it had in the USSR, wherein the populace did not hold mass solidarity with the Russian Orthodox church. The Catholic Church unequivocally condemned Communist ideology. The Communists in Poland largely failed in their attempt to suppress and control the Polish church.

The experiences in World War II, wherein the large Jewish minority was annihilated by the Nazis and the large German minority was forcibly expelled from the country at the end of the war, as well as the loss of the eastern territories that were heavily populated by Eastern Orthodox Ukrainians, led to Poland becoming more homogenously Catholic than it had been in previous times.

After Soviet troops occupied Poland at the end of World War II, the Soviet government then enacted a gradual approach aimed at gaining control of the Catholic Church in Poland. In 1950, the Polish government created the Bureau for Religious Affairs, which had jurisdiction over personnel decisions and organizational functions.

The state tried to take control of the Polish Orthodox Church (with a membership of about half a million) in order to use it as a weapon against the Roman Catholic Church in Poland, and it attempted to control the person who was named as Metropolitan for the Polish Orthodox Church; Metropolitan Dionizy (the post-war head of the POC) was arrested and retired from service after his release.

Under the doctrine of Marxism, the state actively advocated for the disenfranchisement of religion and planned atheization. To this effect, the regime conducted anti-religious propaganda and persecution of clergymen and monasteries. As in most other Communist countries, religion was not outlawed as such (an exception being Albania) and was permitted by the constitution, but the state attempted to achieve an atheistic society.

Persecutions of individuals for religion in the first few years were rare, because the state initially was concerned strictly with suppressing armed political resistance. From 1947 to 1953, the Catholic Church in Poland became the primary target for persecution in Communist Poland. All social and charitable organizations affiliated with the church were made illegal, Catholic schools were closed, crosses were removed from classrooms and hospitals, and a terror campaign was enacted against parishes and monasteries (which included the notable arrest of a group of Jesuits headed by Father Tomasz Rostworowski).

Salesian schools and orphanages were closed. The Rozanystok seminary, which was created in 1949, was brutally liquidated in 1954. It had been moved from Wilno and had been run by Salesians for training candidates for the priesthood, as well as for giving Catholic education for boys. The seminary was situated in Eastern Poland, it employed former residents of the territory annexed by the USSR in 1939, and it had caused great concern to the government, provoking its brutal closure.

Catholic publications continued to exist, although under pressure from the state. These publications included Tygodnik Warszawski (which was defiant to the regime and closed in 1949), Tygodnik Powszechny (whose editors resigned under pressure in 1953 but returned in 1956), and (a publication that attempted to promote coexistence of Catholicism and Communism). This was a liberty that was not allowed to other places in the Soviet bloc (including the USSR most notably, which had banned church publications in 1929). The founders of Tygodnik Warszawski were incarcerated, of which Father Zygmunt Kaczynski and Antoni Antczak both died in prison. Cardinal Wyszynski attempted to intervene on behalf of Father Zygmunt.

Polish society was prepared for the post-World War II persecutions due to its long history prior to the Bolshevik revolution of operation underneath the rule of regimes that were hostile to it. Underground universities taught uncensored history and ethics lessons, and many people openly attended church in protest against the Communist government.

Following with the forcible conversion of Eastern Catholics in the USSR to Orthodoxy, the Polish government called on the Orthodox church in Poland to assume 'pastoral care' of the eastern Catholics in Poland. After the removal of Metropolitan Dionizy from leadership of the Polish Orthodox Church, Metropolitan Macarius was placed in charge. He was from western Ukraine (previously eastern Poland) and who had been instrumental in the compulsory conversion of eastern Catholics to orthodoxy there. Polish security forces assisted him in suppressing resistance in his taking control of Eastern Catholic parishes. Many Eastern Catholics who remained in Poland after the postwar border adjustments were resettled in Western Poland in the newly acquired territories from Germany. The state in Poland gave the POC a greater number of privileges than the Roman Catholic Church in Poland; the state even gave money to this church, although it often defaulted on promised payments, leading to a perpetual financial crisis for the POC.

A notable feature of the anti-religious campaign in Poland included "Patriot Priests" who opposed the church hierarchy and supported Communism. In return, they were rewarded and even sometimes allowed to travel to Rome. These priests could be blackmailed into cooperation. The core of their group was often formed by men who had experienced the camps and been tortured.  The bishops often let them remain at their posts, although they were commonly ostracized by the laity.

After the accession of Wladyslaw Gomulka to power in 1956, the state lightened its restrictions on the Eastern Catholic churches which began to grow back, partly with assistance from the rest of the Catholics.

The security apparatus in Poland, as in other communist nations, recruited members of the clergy. The security service used blackmail, psychological manipulation and a variety of material rewards (e.g. needed medicines for ill relatives) in order to secure the cooperation of clergy. In a reversal, the security service and Polish government had also members in its ranks who were secretly providing beneficial information to the church, but Catholic youth were forced to enroll in Communist Youth organizations.

From the 1960s onward, Poland developed an increasingly vocal Catholic intelligentsia and an active movement of young Catholics. The "Oasis" movement was created in the 1960s by Father Franciszek Blachniki, and it consisted of church activities including pilgrimages, retreats and various ecumenical endeavours. Intense efforts by the state to undermine it failed.

Beginning in the early 1970s, the church moved from a defensive stance to a more aggressive stance in speaking in defence of human rights.

Cardinal Primate of Poland, Stefan Wyszynski, believed that Poland had a special role to play in human history and he supported Polish nationalism as a precursor to the liberation of Eastern Europe from Soviet role. Such ideas were popular among many Polish Catholics, as well. Wyszynski was brought into sharp conflict with the Communist authorities on account of this (he also experienced some conflict with the Vatican); during his reign, he was jailed for three years for his refusal to cooperate with the government. He was both a critic of the regime and a mediator between the regime and the rest of civil society. Wyszynski provided a significant obstacle to the Communists taking control of the church in Poland; he died in 1981 and was replaced by Cardinal Josef Glemp.

After Cardinal Wojtyla of Kraków became Pope John Paul II in 1978, his election was greeted in Poland with great enthusiasm. He visited Poland from June 2–10 in 1979. During his visit, he bluntly challenged communist ideology by declaring that Christianity was the route to true human freedom (as opposed to Marxism) and called people to non-conformance. Over thirteen million people went into the streets to greet him in his visit, in direct defiance to the Polish government. Dissidents in Poland and elsewhere in Eastern Europe took great notice of this fact. Radoslaw Sikorski, in his memoir, later said  We realized for the first time that 'we' were more numerous than 'them'

Within a year, the independent trade union 'Solidarity' was formed, which was initially based on economic concerns, but it soon became deeply affiliated with the church. The Pope promoted Poland's cause as well as the cause of Christians behind the Iron Curtain on an international level, to the great discomfort of the communist governments in the Warsaw Pact. The church in Poland played a key role in the revolution against the regime in the 1980s and provided symbols (the Black Madonna, the suffering Christ, etc.) that gave spiritual depth to the struggle against Communism. It also provided spiritual and material comfort to striking workers, and acted as a mediator between the Solidarity movement and the government. It also held back the striking workers from excesses.

In December 1981, martial law was imposed on Poland. This caused great trouble for the church, and many were rounded up by the military. Cardinal Glemp initially seemed to justify its imposition as a lesser evil, but many in the church defended the people who were arrested.

The Polish Orthodox Church hierarchy, which had had their position in society strengthened since 1945, spoke out against the Solidarity movement. They refused to send delegates to meetings about human rights issues. Some exceptions occurred, such as Fr Piotr Poplawski, an Orthodox priest openly sympathetic to Solidarity who "killed himself" in 1985; several doctors asked to confirm his suicide refused to certify this as the cause of death. A Roman Catholic priest named Jerzy Popiełuszko had been murdered by the police the previous year, and the doctor who performed his autopsy was brought in and also confirmed that Fr Piotr had committed suicide.

Communist authorities blamed nationalist Catholics for fanning strife between Catholic and Orthodox populations.

In the Gdansk accords, the church was given permission to perform radio broadcasts. As the 1980s progressed, the church became increasingly critical of the regime and in the last years of the decade it played a critical role in the transition to democracy.

People's Republic of Romania and Socialist Republic of Romania

The Romanian Orthodox church had a long history of submitting to foreign rulers, and when the Communists took power after the Soviet army occupied Romania, the Communists used this tradition to their advantage. The government ensured that the Patriarch was always someone who was loyal to them and priests who were opposed to the Communists were removed. Under the doctrine of Marxist–Leninist atheism, the People's Republic of Romania took a hostile stance against religion, and set its sights on the ultimate goal of an atheistic society.

After World War II, with Northern Transylvania becoming again part of Romania, non-Orthodox ethnic minorities became more numerous. Rivalries developed in the different religious groups and the government used this to its own advantage by letting the Romanian Orthodox church to strengthen its position in society in exchange for giving greater Communist control over the church. This relationship in Romania had an influence in the elimination of the Eastern Catholic churches (which also occurred in the USSR) and their forcible integration into the Orthodox community.

The Communists chose who served in the church, who was admitted to seminary and even what the content of sermons would be. Although these successive constitutions provided a simulacrum of religious freedom, the regime in fact had a policy of promoting atheism, coupled with religious persecution. The role of religious bodies was strictly limited to their houses of worship, and any visible demonstrations were strictly forbidden. In 1948, in order to minimize the role of the clergy in society, the government adopted a decree nationalizing church property, including schools.

Once the Communists gained complete control of the church in Romania, they felt free to persecute its membership, which the hierarchy of the church turned a blind eye towards. When Nicolae Ceausescu (coming to power in 1965) gained increasing control, the only religious bodies that provided significant dissent to the regime were evangelical Protestants, who formed only a small portion of the population. The church in Romania gave complete submission to the authorities outwardly and focused its membership strictly on inner spirituality; the Romanian church did not receive much assistance from other Orthodox churches in the region.

Some religious revival occurred in Romania in the 1980s and engaged in more open religious practices, which the authorities tolerated. According to the United States Department of State, this toleration was accompanied by ruthless repression, with charismatic religious leaders subject to harassment, imprisonment and forced emigration (and also potentially killed). Religious congregations that were becoming larger in this revival had great difficulties in trying to enlarge their facilities, and some attempted to do so without permission with the government responding by tearing down the new construction. Printing and importing Bibles was very difficult, and reportedly Bibles could be pulped for making toilet paper.

Widespread dissent from religious groups in Romania did not appear until revolution was sweeping across Eastern Europe in 1989. The Patriarch of the Romanian Orthodox Church supported Ceausescu up until the end of the regime, and even congratulated him after the state murdered one hundred demonstrators in Timișoara. It was not until the day before Ceausescu's execution on December 24, 1989 that the Patriarch condemned him as "a new child-murdering Herod".

In Romania, more than 5,000 Orthodox priests were imprisoned, and 400 priests from Romania's Eastern-rite were killed after their community was outlawed. The Orthodox archdiocese of Cluj, contains biographies of 1,700 church personnel jailed.

People's Republic of Hungary

In Hungary, a 443-page collection, published by Gyula Havasy in 1990, reveals 10 church show trials and the detention of 2,800 monks and nuns. Many thousands of Christians were imprisoned and many others were martyred. Perhaps the best known was bishop Vilmos Apor.

People's Republic of Albania

As early as 1945 (when the Communists came to power in Albania), laws were set down that dispossessed religious institutions of their property. This most especially affected the Bektashis, a Sufi order that included 20% of Albania's Muslim population, as they had their tekkes outside of cities and depended for support on their surrounding properties. Roman Catholics (who constituted 10% of Albania's population) had their schools taken away from them by this measure.

At the close of the war, certain religious leaders were imprisoned or executed on grounds that they were spies, that they had worked for the Italians (Mussolini had occupied Albania) or that they were affiliated with Balli Kombetar (a group that had lost out to the Communists). These leaders typically spent decades in prison and hard labour. Baba Murteza of Kruje was tortured and thrown from a prison window to his death in 1946; Baba Kamil Glava of Tepelen was executed by a court in Gjirokastër in 1946; Baba Ali Tomori was executed by a court in 1947; and Baba Shefket Koshtani of Tepelan was shot by a court in 1947. The following Sunni clerics also disappeared: Mustafa Effendi Varoshi (mufti of Durrës), Hafez Ibrahim Dibra (former grand mufti of Albania), and Sheh Xhemel Pazari of Tirana. By 1968, up to 200 religious leaders of all faiths may have been executed or imprisoned.

A drastic decline of religious clerics took place over the course of history from 1945 to 1992. The Roman Catholics had 10% of the clergy in 1992 as they did in 1945 and 0% of religious monastics. The Bektashis had 2% of the clergy in 1993 as they did in the 1940s. This is largely as a result of the virtual cessation of the training of new clerics and the decline related to the antireligious campaign. The Bektashis and the Roman Catholics were the most persecuted religious groups in Albania. The Orthodox (20% of the population) and Sunni Muslims (the majority of the country) were considered less threatening as neither group had been politically active in the 1930s and 1940s, and Sunni Muslims had been isolated from Muslims outside Albania since King Zog had severed ties in the 1930s. The Catholics were well-organized with schools and links to the church outside Albania, while the Bektashis had been active in fighting against the Turks for Albanian independence and had popular respect.

In 1947 the head of the Bektashis, Abas Himli Dede, was proposed a 'reform' to allow dervishes to cut their beards, to marry and to go about towns in civil rather than religious garb. After several days of fruitless dispute, Dede invited the two Communists who proposed the reform to come to his presence, where he shot both of them and then killed himself.

Considerable antireligious propaganda was produced with such slogans as "Religion is not of the enlightened world", "Marxist-Leninism is the true science; as for religion, it is a fabrication that breaks the minds of men", "Religion is tied to outsiders", and "He who believes is ignorant.". They attempted to lessen the power of important religious centres by moving the administrative authority of these centres to marginal centres with little historical or sacred association, and often in incovenient locations. The remaining religious leaders who accepted this transfer were then relegated to what was essentially house arrest in these marginal centres.

The culmination of the antireligious campaign occurred when Enver Hoxha declared the state atheist in 1967. He declared that Albania is the world's first atheistic state, whose only religion is Albanianism. (Pashko Vasa, during the movement of Albanian independence had also stated that Albania's only religion is Albanianism, and Hoxha's statement referred to this)

The communist regime conducted a brutal and sustained campaign to suppress religion in Albania, and by 1967 2,167 religious buildings had been closed or converted to other uses.  The Roman Catholic cathedral in Shkodër became a sports arena and several Bektashi tekkes, including the headquarters in Tirana, became retirement homes. After the fall of Communism there were only three churches in Tirana; thirty of the most famous churches in the country survived by being marked for historical preservation. The 18th century Edhem Bey Mosque in Tirana was also protected as a cultural monument, but only foreign diplomats were allowed to pray there. Of 1,050 mosques in Albania before 1967, 800 survived to the fall of Communism, but most were damaged and in states of disrepair. Of the 53 Bektashi tekkes, 6 survived.

Article 37 was added to the Albanian constitution in 1967, which read:  The state recognizes no religion and supports and carries out atheistic propaganda in order to implant a scientific materialistic world outlook in people

Young people were encouraged to attack mosques, churches and tekkes and to turn in remaining clergy to the authorities. Clergy who were still alive by 1967 and had survived twenty years of persecution, were killed or sent to hard labour camps. Most mosques had their minarets destroyed, tombstones with any religious symbols were overturned, people caught wearing religious symbols (e.g. crucifixes, medallions of the Quran) could be sentenced to 10 years imprisonment, and people stopped saying words such as 'mashallah' or 'inshallah' in public for fear of punishment. Merely mentioning religious holidays could lead to punishment; in one instance a drunk villager in Libohova said that the next day was Bayram (a Muslim holiday) and he was given a fine. Former religious holidays were changed to holidays that honoured the labor force. To prevent people from giving religious names to children, a dictionary of approved names for children was published and parents were legally required to choose from the names listed in the dictionary in order to name their children.

Hoxha during this time spoke about the condition of women in Albania; he scapegoated religion for lowering the status of women and congratulated Communism for raising their status. When Hoxha died in 1985, the government did not change its policies immediately. In 1988 Albanian emigre religious leaders were allowed to visit Albania; in 1989 Mother Teresa (herself an ethnic Albanian born in the Ottoman Empire) came to visit Albania after being given permission (she was previously denied permission). In 1990 phrases like 'inshallah' were permitted to be said again. In November 1990, near the end of the regime, in the northern city of Shkodër a Catholic priest named father Simon Jubani was released from prison after 26 years, and he celebrated Mass in a cemetery for five thousand people; he was immediately arrested for worship in public, but when the building that he was being held in was surrounded by people, he was released again, and he performed another public Mass for 50,000 people. In December 1990, the law against public religious practice was rescinded; the regime was overthrown in the following months, and religious buildings re-opened.

See also
 Religion in the Soviet Union
 Persecutions of the Catholic Church and Pius XII
 Soviet anti-religious legislation
 Persecution of Muslims in the former USSR
 Red Terror
 USSR anti-religious campaign (1921–1928)
 USSR anti-religious campaign (1928–1941)
 USSR anti-religious campaign (1958–1964)
 USSR anti-religious campaign (1970s–1990)
 Clerical collaboration with communist secret services

References

 
Eastern Bloc
Warsaw Pact
History of Christianity in Europe
Christians
20th-century Christianity